The indigenous Gran Chaco people consist of approximately thirty-five tribal groups in the Gran Chaco of South America.  Because, like the Great Plains of North America, the terrain lent itself to a nomadic lifestyle, there is little to no archaeological evidence of their prehistoric occupation.  Contributing to this near-absence of archaeological data is the lack of suitable raw material for stone tools or permanent construction and soil conditions that are not conducive to the preservation of organic material.

Geography
The actual cultural area of the Gran Chaco peoples differs from that of the geographic Gran Chaco.  The northwestern boundary of the cultural area is the Parapetí River and the marshes of the Bañados de Izozog depression, beyond which were the lands of the cultural unrelated Chané and Chiriguano. The cultural boundaries have not been static, even during historical times.  In the late 17th century the area expanded to the east across the Paraguay River, when the Mbayá invaded the lands between the Apa River and the Miranda River in Mato Grosso do Sul province in Brazil.

Languages

The tribal groups of the Gran Chaco fall into six language families:
 Matacoan languages or Mataco-maká (Wichí languages, Chorote languages, Nivaclé languages and the Maká language)
 Guaicuruan languages 
 Lule–Vilela languages
 Mascoian languages
 Zamucoan languages
 Tupi–Guarani languages

Many of the languages are part of a Chaco linguistic area. Common Chaco areal features include SVO word order and active-stative verb alignment. (See also Mataco–Guaicuru languages.)

See also
 Campo del Cielo
 Classification of indigenous peoples of the Americas#Gran Chaco
 Gran Chaco#Indigenous peoples of the Gran Chaco

References

Bibliography

Further reading
 
 

History of South America